John Roger Muse (born August 1, 1988) is an American ice hockey goaltender who is currently with Glasgow Clan in the UK Elite Ice Hockey League (EIHL). Muse was most recently with Rødovre Mighty Bulls in the Danish Metal Ligaen. He also previously played with the Wilkes-Barre/Scranton Penguins of the American Hockey League (AHL) while under contract to the Pittsburgh Penguins of the National Hockey League (NHL).

Playing career

Amateur
Muse grew up in Falmouth, Massachusetts and played high school hockey at Noble and Greenough School under the coaching of Brian Day. He went on to play in college for the Boston College Eagles in the NCAA's Division I Hockey East conference.

Muse was a four-year player for Boston College, helping the Eagles to win the NCAA Division I National Championships in the 2007–2008 and 2009–2010 seasons, recording a 5–0 shutout against the Wisconsin Badgers in the 2010 National Championship game, becoming only the fourth goalie to do so in NCAA history.

Muse also backstopped for BC's Hockey East regular-season championship in 2010, as well as Beanpot Tournament and Hockey East tournament championships in 2008, 2010, and 2011. He finished his collegiate career with a record of 89–39–16, including 12 shutouts.

Professional
Following his college career, Muse was signed to an amateur tryout contract by the AHL's Portland Pirates, winning his only start for them. On July 18, 2011, Muse signed a two-way AHL deal with the Charlotte Checkers. He attended 2011 training camp with the NHL's Carolina Hurricanes, but was sent to Charlotte, then to Florida, for training camps.

Muse's first full professional season saw him spending time in both the ECHL and AHL, recording 15 games in Charlotte and 25 in Florida, where he shared netminding duties with Pat Nagle. Muse helped to lead Florida to their first Kelly Cup and their third Kelly Cup Final, recording a shutout win against Kalamazoo (7–0, with 32 saves), and the first 2/3 of a shutout against Elmira (5–0, Muse had 11 saves, but he did not play the 3rd period due to a lower-body injury). He was awarded the Kelly Cup MVP trophy following the Everblades victory in Game 5.

On June 7, 2012, Muse was signed to his first NHL contract with the Everblades parent affiliate, the Carolina Hurricanes, on a one-year contract. Due to the NHL lockout, Muse was directly returned initially to the Checkers, before splitting the year for a second consecutive season with the Everblades.

On August 6, 2013, with limited NHL interest, Muse signed as a free agent to remain in the ECHL with the Fort Wayne Komets. After starting the season on the Komet's roster, Muse was signed to a PTO by the Checkers due to injuries to Cam Ward and Anton Khudobin. In his first two starts for the Checkers, Muse recorded back to back 5–0 shutouts. By December, he had collected a record of 9–6–0 with a 2.29 GAA and .922 save percentage. As his PTO contract was nearing its end, the Checkers decided to extend an AHL deal to keep Muse in the organization through the end of the 2013–2014 season.

On August 4, 2015, Muse left the Checkers as a free agent to sign a one-year AHL contract with the Texas Stars. In the 2015–16 season, Muse assumed the backup role with the Stars, appearing in 19 games. Unable to replicate his form from previous years, Muse was traded by the Stars back to the Checkers for future considerations on February 29, 2016. After returning to Charlotte, Muse assumed the starting role for 18 of the remaining 21 games, collecting a 9–6–1 record with a 2.08 G.A.A. and .918 Sv. %. On March 14, 2016, Muse was named the AHL Player of the Week for the third time in his career.

On July 21, 2016, Muse continued his tenure in the AHL, signing a one-year contract as a free agent with the Rochester Americans. In the 2016–17 season, Muse appeared in 14 games with the Americans, collecting just 3 wins. He split the season in being assigned to the Elmira Jackals of the ECHL for 6 games.

As a free agent from the Americans, Muse signed with the Lehigh Valley Phantoms on a one-year deal on July 6, 2017. After appearing in 8 games with the Phantoms, and proving an adequate option, Muse was signed to a one-year, two-way contract with NHL affiliate, the Philadelphia Flyers, for the remainder of the 2017–18 season on February 26, 2018.

In the following off-season, Muse secured his second successive NHL contract, agreeing to a one-year, two-way contract with the Pittsburgh Penguins on July 1, 2018. In the following 2018–19 season, he split the year between Penguin affiliates, Wilkes-Barre/Scranton Penguins of the AHL and the Wheeling Nailers of the ECHL.

After spells with Kunlun Red Star, KRS-BSU and Danish club Rødovre Mighty Bulls, Muse signed for UK EIHL side Sheffield Steelers in March 2021, ahead of the 2021 Elite Series.

Muse rejoined Rodovre for the 2021-22 season. In October 2022, Muse returned to the UK to join Glasgow Clan.

Career statistics

Awards and honors

Led ECHL with .931 save percentage in 2017-18 for Reading Royals
All-time winningest goaltender in Charlotte Checkers (AHL) history
2012 Kelly Cup Playoffs MVP
2011 Recipient of the Walter Brown Award, given to New England's Best American-born Division I College Hockey Player
2011 Recipient of Boston College's "Outstanding Senior Male Scholar-Athlete Award."
Named Beanpot Tournament MVP in 2010, playing in the classic college hockey tournament. Also awarded the 2010 Eberly trophy, given annually to the goalie with the best save percentage in the Beanpot tournament.
2007 co-winner of the Bernie Burke Outstanding Freshman Award
Holds BC records in saves (3,696), games played (144), and single season saves. (1,171, 2007–2008)
NCAA All Tournament Team 2008, 2010

References

External links

1988 births
American men's ice hockey goaltenders
Boston College Eagles men's ice hockey players
Charlotte Checkers (2010–) players
Elmira Jackals (ECHL) players
Florida Everblades players
Fort Wayne Komets players
Glasgow Clan players
Ice hockey players from Massachusetts
KRS-BSU players
HC Kunlun Red Star players
Lehigh Valley Phantoms players
Living people
People from Falmouth, Massachusetts
Portland Pirates players
Reading Royals players
Rochester Americans players
Rødovre Mighty Bulls players
Sheffield Steelers players
Texas Stars players
Wheeling Nailers players
Wilkes-Barre/Scranton Penguins players
AHCA Division I men's ice hockey All-Americans
American expatriate ice hockey players in Scotland
American expatriate ice hockey players in Denmark
American expatriate ice hockey players in England
American expatriate ice hockey players in China